Blood Sisters is a 2005 novel by Barbara Keating and Stephanie Keating.

Blood Sisters may also refer to:

Film and television
Sisters (1972 film) or Blood Sisters, a film by Brian De Palma
BloodSisters (1995 film), a documentary by Michelle Handelman
The Blood Sisters (TV series), a 2018 Filipino television series
Blood Sisters (2022 series), a Netflix original limited-series

Literature
Blood Sisters, a 1981 novel by Valerie Miner
Bloodsisters, a 1982 novel by John A. Russo
"Blood Sisters", a short story by Greg Egan in Hackers (anthology), a 1991 collection

See also
 Blood brother (disambiguation)
 Sisters Adorers of the Precious Blood, a religious order